The 1938–39 season was Port Vale's 33rd season of football in the English Football League, and their first ever season in the Third Division South, having switched from the Third Division North in summer 1938. It was the club's last full season of football before the breakout of war in Europe. It was thus the last season of competitive football for many of the players, including Tom Nolan, who became the club's top scorer for the fourth and final time with seventeen goals. Progressing to the semi-final stage of the Football League Third Division South Cup, they could progress no further as the tournament was cancelled before its conclusion. Manager Tom Morgan shocked the club by leaving for another position in March.

Overview

Third Division South
The pre-season saw another reconstruction of the first eleven, as eleven new signings arrived at The Old Recreation Ground, most notably: highly rated goalkeeper Arthur Jepson (Grantham Town); veteran left-back George Collin (Sunderland); right-half George Hannah (Derby County); left-half Sid Wileman (signed from Derby for 'a substantial fee'); and goalscoring winger John Callender (Lincoln City). Work at the stadium took place, as ground outside the stadium was prepared for car parking. The eclectic training schedule of the previous season was expanded, with bowls and cricket supplemented by games of tennis and baseball. Also on 20 August, a Football League Jubilee Fund match was played against nearby Crewe Alexandra, with the Vale picking up a 3–2 win, raising £243 in the process.

The season began with George Heppell in goal, as Nottinghamshire County Cricket Club at first refused to allow Jepson to play. With three defeats in the first four games, most of the new men were dropped, as Morgan struggled to find consistency in his picks. It took until the end of October for the team to get into their stride, as their 5–1 win over Walsall was their fifth consecutive home win. They also travelled to St James Park to record a 3–1 win over Exeter City – their first away win since September 1937. Nottinghamshire CCC seemed justified in initially refusing Jepson permission to play, as he played seventy minutes of the game with his right hand strapped up, having dislocated his fingers. Ken Fish was then sold to BSC Young Boys of Switzerland, having fallen out of favour; yet the directors refused to hear offers for the rest of the team, determined as they were to strengthen the team. Despite stylish play, especially from Alf Bellis, the club then went from Guy Fawkes Night to New Year's Eve without a victory, their five defeats taking them to just two points clear of the re-election zone. Ending their run with a 4–0 win over Bristol City, they lost Jack Roberts to a dislocated shoulder.

Trying out new, young players in 1939, the club re-signed veteran forward Tommy Ward from Stoke City. A 4–0 hammering at Fellows Park from bottom-placed Walsall left Vale third-from-bottom by March. Disgruntled supporters turned against the team, as regular barracking was directed at the players. Roberts and Jepson struggled with injuries, but by March the newcomers had finally gelled as a group, and results soon picked up. Yet manager Tom Morgan shocked the club by leaving for the vacant position at Wrexham, leaving the club somewhat rudderless. Despite receiving a 4–0 beating from Notts County at Meadow Lane, the players rallied to produce four points from their last three games. Two of these points came from a 2–0 win over champions Newport County at Somerton Park, making Vale the only team to have recorded the double over "Ironsides" that season.

They finished in eighteenth place with 37 points, then a club record low position. They were four points clear of having to petition for re-election, and eighteen points short of promotion. Their 52 goals scored was a poor record, though a total of 58 goals conceded was much improved on the previous campaign. Nolan's seventeen goals were the only major contribution in front of goal.

Finances
On the financial side, gate receipts had increased by £659, however an overall loss was made of £1,723. The move to the southern division had cost a considerable amount in transfer fees, though home game income had improved by £676 to £6,403. Further financial worries were lessened by a transfer credit of £1,455. Despite the poor season, seventeen players were kept on, though promising teenage midfielder John Smith was sold to Chelsea. Other departures included Harry Davies (retired); Leonard Smart; Tommy Ward (Mansfield Town); Arthur Caldwell; Arthur Masters; George Collin (Burton Town); Sid Wileman (Hinckley United); and John Callender (Gateshead).

Cup competitions
In the FA Cup, Vale overcame Wrexham of the Third Division North 2–1 at the Racecourse Ground. However they crashed out at the Second Round, losing 1–0 at home to league rivals Southend United. For both matches the players had relaxed beforehand with activities such as golf, country walks, and games of snooker.

In the short-lived Football League Third Division South Cup, the "Valiants" progressed to the semi-finals at the expense of Walsall (4–0), Mansfield Town (3–1), and Ipswich Town (2–0). In the semis they came to a goalless stalemate with Queens Park Rangers at Loftus Road – the tournament was cancelled at this stage, and so no club would win it. The club had actually lost money in the much-maligned tournament, as atrocious attendances were not enough to even pay player bonuses. Port Vale and Queens Park Rangers actually protested in favour of cancelling the tournament due to the financial failure of the cup, and the Football League agreed with them to 'wash out' the competition.

League table

Results
Port Vale's score comes first

Football League Third Division South

Results by matchday

Matches

FA Cup

Third Division South Cup

Player statistics

Appearances

Top scorers

Transfers

Transfers in

Transfers out

References
Specific

General

Port Vale F.C. seasons
Port Vale